Huntsburg Township is one of the sixteen townships of Geauga County, Ohio, United States. As of the 2020 census the population was 3,657, up from 3,297 at the 2000 census.

Huntsburg is home to a sizable Amish community that is part of the Middlefield settlement, the fourth largest in the world.

Geography
Located in the eastern part of the county, it borders the following townships:
Montville Township - north
Hartsgrove Township, Ashtabula County - northeast corner
Windsor Township, Ashtabula County - east
Mesopotamia Township, Trumbull County - southeast corner
Middlefield Township - south
Burton Township - southwest corner
Claridon Township - west
Hambden Township - northwest corner

No municipalities are located in Huntsburg Township.

Name and history
Huntsburg Township was established in 1821. The township was named for Dr. Eben Hunt, an original owner of the land. It is the only Huntsburg Township statewide.

Government
The township is governed by a three-member board of trustees, who are elected in November of odd-numbered years to a four-year term beginning on the following January 1. Two are elected in the year after the presidential election and one is elected in the year before it. There is also an elected township fiscal officer, who serves a four-year term beginning on April 1 of the year after the election, which is held in November of the year before the presidential election. Vacancies in the fiscal officership or on the board of trustees are filled by the remaining trustees.

References

External links
Huntsburg Township official website
County website

Townships in Geauga County, Ohio
Amish in Ohio
Townships in Ohio